The Alfred Wegener Institute, Helmholtz Centre for Polar and Marine Research (German: Alfred-Wegener-Institut, Helmholtz-Zentrum für Polar- und Meeresforschung) is located in Bremerhaven, Germany, and a member of the Helmholtz Association of German Research Centres. It conducts research in the Arctic, the Antarctic, and the high and mid latitude oceans. Additional research topics are: North Sea research, marine biological monitoring, and technical marine developments. The institute was founded in 1980 and is named after meteorologist, climatologist, and geologist Alfred Wegener.

History 

The foundation of the AWI happened in a political environment that was characterized by system competition between East and West. The GDR had been conducting its own Antarctic research for decades. In the 1970s it became clear that there would be one scarcity of biological- and mineral resources. Also due to the experience of the oil crisis of 1973, the Federal Republic of Germany decided to intensify its activities in polar research for geostrategic reasons and undertake larger research projects in the Antarctic Ocean and in Antarctica. In 1975/76 and 1977/78 expeditions were conducted to exploration of migration routs of the krill.

In 1978 the German Bundestag decided that polar research will be a governmental task of national interest, that West Germany will become a member of the Antarctic Treaty System and will found a polar research institute. In 1980 the "AWI act" was decided by the Bürgerschaft of Bremen.

The founding director was Gotthilf Hempel. The construction of the first German antarctic base, the first Georg von Neumayer station (GvN station I), had already begun in 1979. In 1981 the station was operational. In 1978, the Federal Ministry of Education and Research commissioned the tender for a research icebreaker. After the public tender, the hull of the first German polar research ship was laid by HDW Howaldtswerke-Deutsche Werft in 1981. The RV Polarstern has been in operation for the AWI since 1982.

On 24 February 1985, the Polar 3, a research airplane of the institute of the type Dornier 228, was shot down by members of Polisario Front over West Sahara. Both pilots and the mechanic died. Polar 3, together with unharmed Polar 2, was on its way back from Antarctica and had taken off in Dakar, Senegal, to reach Arrecife, Canary Islands.

In 1986 the main building of AWi were build at "Old harbour" (Alten Hafen) in the center of Bremerhaven by plans of architect Oswald Mathias Ungers (Building D). In 2004 the headquarter of AWI moved to Fischereihafenschleuse and a new building by Otto Steidle had been built at Am Handelshafen.

In January 2005, Polar 4 was severely damaged during a rough landing at the British overwintering station Rothera on the Antarctic Peninsula. As it was impossible to repair the plane, the aircraft had to be decommissioned. Since then, scientific and logistical tasks of polar flights have been performed by Polar 2.

After years of preparation Alfred Wegener Institute conduct up from September 2019 the international arctic expedition MOSAiC 2019-2020, which was one of the largest research actions of its kind. About 600 scientist from more than 20 countries worked at different task in extrem circumstances. The research action had a budget of 140 million Euros. Also no other polar research trip was exploited as much in the media as the MOSAiC expedition since then. The Alfred Wegener Institute increased its press department before and during the expedition, hired a "Communications Manager MOSAiC" and an own photographer to feed “MOSAiC” channels on Twitter and Instagram.

At the beginning, the AWI focus was o set up the complex infrastructure for research in the Arctic and Antarctic regions. In addition to international prestige, the territorial claim to resources from terrestrial and maritime areas was one of the reasons for Germany for the cost-intensive work of Alfred Wegener Institute. Climatologists and geophysicists at AWI recognized the fatal effects of global warming in the most affected geographical areas in the 1980this early on, but gained less attention outside the scientific community. In the 1990s, the mainly geophysical-oceanographic research was expanded to include the biological aspects of polar and deep-sea habitats, among other things. From the 2000s, the problem of climate change reached the consciousness of German society and the politics that funded the AWI. The focus and promotion of the institus work get adopted to the debate about global change. Current projects had often also the aim to research special aspect of climate change and the effectes of global warming especially to the polar regions. With the director Boetius, the public relations and the marketing of the polar research were pushed forward.

Research 
The institute has three major departments: 
Climate System Department, which studies oceans, ice and atmosphere as physical and chemical systems.
Biosciences Department, which studies the biological processes in marine and coastal ecosystems.
Geoscientific Department, which studies climate development, especially as revealed by sediments.

Facilities 
The institute is distributed over several sites within North Germany and the Otto Schmidt Laboratory for Polar and Marine Research (OSL) at the Arctic and Antarctic Research Institute (AARI) in Saint Petersburg as Russian-German cooperation in the field of Arctic research, named after the polar explorer Otto Schmidt.

Bremerhaven

The headquarters was founded by Gotthilf Hempel. Nowadays, the AWI has several buildings within the city of Bremerhaven.

 Building D is located next to the old port (German: Alter Hafen). The dark clink-brick building was designed by Oswald Mathias Ungers in 1985 who won the architecture-award BDA-prize for the building. It hosts the AWI library, the main lecture hall and various laboratories and offices.
 The main building E is next to the lock Doppelschleuse. Main characteristics are the chequered tiles and the fact that there are three office towers. The building was designed by Otto Steidle and constructed in 2004 as an extension of the complex A,B,C.
 House F is close to the Weser ferry at the Geeste estuary. The housing association StäWoG (German: Städtische Wohnungsgesellschaft) renovated the building of the former nautical college (German: Hochschule für Seefahrt) in 1999. For this reason, there is a  planetarium which is nowadays used by the Bremerhaven's friends of the stars.
 The small Bathymetry Building is located close to the radar tower.
 The Nordsee Villa formerly belonged to the fast-food restaurant chain Nordsee and hosts a few offices of AWI. Nowadays it is a Haus der Technik and part of the oldest German institute for technical further education with close cooperation to RWTH Aachen and other universities.
 The Harbour Warehouse (German: Hafenlager) is located within the Lloyd Werft, see Lloyd Werft Map.

Potsdam
The Forschungsstelle Potsdam is situated on the Telegrafenberg next to Potsdam. It belongs to AWI since 1992. The research focuses on the atmospheric physics and atmospheric chemistry of the atmosphere on the one hand and periglacial research on the other hand.

Sylt
The Wadden Sea Station Sylt is located on the North German island Sylt.
It was founded in 1924 as an oyster laboratory to study the decline of oyster stocks and in order to study how they could be cultivated. In 1937, the name changed from oyster laboratory to Wadden Sea station. The station grew, and in 1949 the station was shifted from the northernmost edge of the island to the current location, next to the harbor of List. In 1998 the station became part of AWI. Nowadays, there are about 30 scientists and technicians. Two guest houses allow to perform workshops and video conferences are possible with the AWI headquarters.

The research focuses on coast ecology and coast geology. In the 1930 there have been oyster reefs below the mussel banks at the water level. Below these, there have been sabellaria reefs which have been destroyed by fishery. Nowadays there are only the mussel banks left.

Helgoland
The station exists since 1892. Scientists study the ecology of the North Sea in this research station.

Since 1962, at Heligoland roadstead , phytoplankton and water samples are taken every weekday morning, 
the turbidity is measured (e.g. using a Secchi disk) and other parameters are recorded. The North Sea warmed by 1.65 °C since the start of the time series.

Stations
The institute maintains several research stations around the Arctic Ocean and on the Antarctic continent.

Neumayer Station

The new station (Webcam) is a futuristic-looking combined platform above the snow surface offering space for research, operations, and living since 2009. The station stands on 16 hydraulic posts which are used to adjust the building to the growing snow cover. A balloon-launching hall is located on the stations roof. Below the station PistenBully, Ski-Doos, sledges, and other equipment are stored in a garage built beneath the snow, with a ramp with a lid that seals the hole for the vehicles to enter.
In summer, the station can host up to 40 people. The station contains several laboratories, has a weather balloon launching facility, and a hospital with telemedical equipment. The station has a stairwell and several utility and storage rooms in the garage. There is a snowmelt and power unit at the station.

Dallmann Laboratory

The station is named after Eduard Dallmann, a German whaler, trader and Polar explorer who lived near Bremen.

Koldewey Station

Kohnen Station

Kohnen Station was established in 2001 as logistical base for ice core drilling in Dronning Maud Land, Antarctica, at

Samoylov Station
Samoylov Station is a Russian research station at  lays within the Lena Delta close to the Laptev Sea. The station was set up as a logistic base for joint Russian-German permafrost studies by the Lena Delta Reserve (LDR) and the AWI.

Ships
Altogether there are six ships that belong to AWI.

RV Polarstern

The AWI flagship is Germany's research icebreaker RV Polarstern. The ship was commissioned in 1982. The double-hulled icebreaker is operational up to temperatures as low as −50 °C (−58 °F). Polarstern can break through sea ice of 1.5 m thickness at a speed of 5 knots, thicker ice must be broken by ramming. A possible but not probable follow-up flagship might be the research icebreaker Aurora Borealis.

RV Heincke
The vessel RV Heincke is a multifunctional and low-noise ship for research in ice-free waters, named after German zoologist and ichthyologist Friedrich Heincke . With a length of 54.6 m, a width of 12.5 m and a draft 4.16 m, the ship is categorized as "medium research vessel" within the German research fleet. 
The ship was put into operation in 1990, its building costs have been around 16 Millionen Euro.
On the vessel, up to 12 scientists and 8 crew members can work for up to 30 passage days. This corresponds to an operating range of roughly 7500 nautical miles. The shipowner is Briese Schiffahrts GmbH & Co. KG from Leer, a city in East Frisia.

RV Uthörn

The research cutter RV Uthörn is named after the small island Uthörn next to Sylt in the North Sea. The vessel is regularly on research tours in German Bight, but is also used to supply the AWI branch Biologische Anstalt Helgoland mentioned above. Two scientists and four crew members can live and work on board for up to 180 days, but the vessel mainly used for day trips. Another operation purpose are short term cruises of a few hours for up to 25 students to demonstrate oceanographic and biological sampling methods.

Being commissioned in 1982 RV Uthörn replaced a vessel with the same name which was built in 1947 and had a length of 24 m. The current vessel is powered by two V12
four-stroke Diesel engines manufactured by the company MWM GmbH from Mannheim. Each engine delivers up to 231 kW to a controllable-pitch propeller; the maximal speed is around 10 kn.
On the working deck, there is a dry lab and a laboratory for wet work like sorting fish. The ship is equipped with standard sampling devices: You may find on board a demersal trawl, a Van Veen Grab Sampler, Niskin bottles, and even deprecated reversing thermometers for teaching purposes.

Mya, Mya II, Aade and Diker
The research catamaran Mya was a specially designed for research in the intertidal zone, it could fall dry at low tide. In 2013 it was replaced by the conventional ship Mya II. The main research area is the Wadden Sea and offshore wind farms. 
Last but not least, there are two small motor boats, Aade and Diker for sampling and diving operations around Heligoland.

Aircraft

Past aircraft

The Alfred Wegener Institute operated five airplanes under the name of Polar, those being:
 Polar 1, a Dornier 128 commissioned in 1983, now in possession of the TU Braunschweig
 Polar 2, a Dornier 228 commissioned in 1983, still in service with the AWI
 Polar 3, like Polar 2 commissioned in 1983, shot down possibly by SA-2 Guideline missile on 24 February 1985 over Western Sahara
 Polar 4, a Dorniers 228 commissioned in 1985, severely damaged at a landing at the British Rothera Research Station in 2005, now on display at the Institute

Current fleet

AWI currently uses two Basler BT-67. These planes are 20 m long, 5.2 m high and have a wingspan of 29 m. The empty weight is 7680 kg, with ski landing gear it weighs 8340 kg.
The minimal cruising speed is 156 km/h, the maximum is SFA. Without payload, the flying range is around 3900 km. The planes are maintained by the company Kenn Borek Air located in Calgary, Alberta, Canada.

Polar 5
The plane hull was built in 1942 but completely refurbished after the AWI acquired the plane in 2007. Since then it "has supplied a large volume of valuable data" said Prof. Heinrich Miller, the former director of the AWI.

Polar 6
This plane with the call sign C-GHGF was acquired by AWI in 2011. The BMBF, the German Federal Minister of Education and Research funded the purchase and equipping of the plane with a total of 9.78 million euros.

See also 
 Open access in Germany
 Ocean Frontier Institute, an oceans research centre in Halifax, Canada

References

External links
 Official website

Research institutes in Germany
Environmental research institutes
Earth science research institutes
Organisations based in Bremerhaven
Environmental organizations established in 1980
Research institutes established in 1980
1980 establishments in West Germany
Antarctica research agencies
Non-profit organisations based in Bremen (state)